
Gmina Międzybórz is an urban-rural gmina (administrative district) in Oleśnica County, Lower Silesian Voivodeship, in south-western Poland. It is part of the Wrocław metropolitan area.

Neighbouring gminas
Gmina Międzybórz is bordered by the gminas of Kobyla Góra, Sośnie, Syców and Twardogóra.

Villages
Apart from the town of Międzybórz, the gmina contains the villages of Bąków, Bukowina Sycowska, Dziesławice, Hałdrychowice, Kamień, Klonów, Kraszów, Królewska Wola, Ligota Rybińska, Niwki Kraszowskie, Niwki Książęce, Ose and Oska Piła.

References

Miedzyborz
Oleśnica County